Arise Awake Park is a recreation park in Mangalore city of Karnataka state in India. It comprises a water fountain with LED, garden and lawn. It also contains a 220-foot-long acupressure track created using round pebbles. This park which was earlier known as Lions Park was renovated by the Ramakrishna Mission to mark the completion of 20 weeks of cleanliness drive in Mangalore.It is situated at Karangalpady locality of Mangalore.

Gallery

References

Parks in Mangalore
Tourist attractions in Mangalore